Mobilicoccus is a genus of bacteria from the family Dermatophilaceae.

References

Micrococcales
Bacteria genera